Sharon Raquel Luengo González (born in Maracaibo, Venezuela on September 16, 1971) is a Venezuelan model and beauty pageant titleholder who competed as Miss Costa Oriental in her country's national beauty pageant Miss Venezuela, obtaining the Photogenic award and the title of Miss World Venezuela.

As her nation's official representative to the Miss World pageant held in London, United Kingdom on November 8, 1990, she won the Photogenic award for the second time and became 2nd runner-up to eventual winner, Gina Tolleson of the United States.

She previously won Model of the World 1990, a beauty pageant held in Taipei, Taiwan, on June 18, 1990.

References

External links
Miss Venezuela Official Website
Miss World Official Website

1971 births
Living people
People from Maracaibo
Miss World 1990 delegates
Miss Venezuela World winners
Venezuelan beauty pageant winners